Pauline Chapel may refer to:

Cappella Paolina in the Vatican
The Cappella Paolina in the church of Santa Maria Maggiore
The Cappella Paolina in the Quirinal Palace
Pauline Chapel (Colorado Springs, Colorado), a chapel on the National Register of Historic Places